is a Japanese former actor and singer. He is a former member of Johnny's Jr. He is a formerly represented with 7teen Group.

Television appearances

Variety programmes/music programmes

Dramas

Documentary dramas

Stage

Films

Discography

References

Male actors from Kanagawa Prefecture
1982 births
Living people